Saoner is a city and tehsil headquarters in north part of Nagpur district in state of Maharashtra, India. The town is governed by Savner municipal council. Saoner is located on the bank of Kolar River. It is historically and mythologically important.

History

Saoner is said to be mentioned in the Jaimini Ashwamedh under the name of Saraswatpur, and there are many legends connected with it. Ancient Shiv temple also known as Hemadpanti Shiv temple is also located near the bank of Kolar river. Ancient temple of Lord Ganesh is located at the neighboring village of Adasa on a hill.  Saoner is also of historic importance due to its role in the 1942 Quit India Movement against the British.

Demographics
 India census, the town of Saoner had a population of 1,50,000. Males constituted 51% of the population and females 49%. Saoner had an average literacy rate of 89%, higher than the national average of 59.5%: male literacy was 89%, and female literacy was 88%. In Saoner, 14% of the population was under 6 years of age.

Climate

Saoner has tropical wet and dry climate (Köppen climate classification) with dry conditions prevailing for most of the year. It receives about 163 mm of rainfall in June. The amount of rainfall is increased in July to 294 mm. Gradual decrease of rainfall has been observed from July to August (278 mm) and September (160 mm). The highest recorded daily rainfall was 304 mm on 14 July 1994. Summers are extremely hot, lasting from March to June, with May being the hottest month. Winter lasts from November to January, during which temperatures drop below 10 °C (50 °F). The highest recorded temperature in the city was 48 °C on 19 May 2015, while the lowest was 3.9 °C.

Extreme Weather

The average number of Heat wave days occurring in Saoner in the Summer months of March, April & May is 0.5, 2.4 and 7.2 days respectively. May is the most uncomfortable and hottest month with, for example, 18 days of heat waves being experienced in 1973, 1988 and 2010. The summer season is characterized by other severe weather activity like thunderstorms, dust storms, hailstorms and squalls. Generally, hailstorms occur during March and dust storms during March and April. These occur infrequently (0.1 per day).  Squalls occur more frequently with 0.3 per day in March and April rising to 0.8 per day in May.

Culture 
The city of Saoner has a rich Culture in Vidarbha. Co-existence of communal harmony is an excellent example in Saoner, wherein people of all caste come together to celebrate 
Pola (Festival of Bullocks), Eid, Christmas, Holi and Diwali.  Famous Marathi writer Ram Ganesh Gadkari breathed his last here.

Places

Adasa is a historical and ritual place of Hindu. It has a big Ganesh temple. It is 8 km from Saoner.

Dhapewada is the place which is famous for temple of lord Vitthal this place is also known as “Pandharapur of vidarbha” the Rathyatara of Dhapewada is known in whole Maharashtra.

Waki is famous in whole india for the sufi saint Hazarat Baba Tajuddin there are annual fair organised in waki every Hindu Muslim join this fair

Economy
Coal mining, textile and paper industry, are the financial growth drivers. The primary occupation of its people is Agriculture. Saoner is part of Ramtek (Lok Sabha constituency). The local language is Marathi.  Most of the bridges and government buildings were built by the British Government in the late 1930s. WCL (Western Coalfields India Limited) has 5 under ground(UG) coal mines, coal is mined and transported with the help of railway wagons to Khaparkheda Thermal Powerhouse. Weekly market is held on Fridays.

Transportation

Saoner is well connected to Nagpur by railway and road. State Government of Maharashtra and Madhya Pradesh operate stage carrier bus service, besides private taxis and autos. The iconic NH 47 passes via Saoner.

References

Cities and towns in Nagpur district
Nagpur district
Talukas in Maharashtra